This is a timeline documenting events of Jazz in the year 1970.

Events

June
 17 – The 4th Montreux Jazz Festival started in Montreux, Switzerland (June 17 – 22).

July
 10
 Lee Morgan records Live at the Lighthouse (July 10 – 12), at the Lighthouse Café in Hermosa Beach, California.
 The 17th Newport Jazz Festival started in Newport, Rhode Island (July 10 – 12).

September
 18 – The 13th Monterey Jazz Festival started in Monterey, California (September 18 – 20).

Album releases

Bill Evans: Montreux II
Bill Evans: Bill Evans Alone
Paul Bley: Improvisie
Marion Brown: Afternoon of a Georgia Faun
Alice Coltrane: Ptah, the El Daoud
McCoy Tyner: Extensions
Art Ensemble of Chicago: Les Stances a Sophie
Sonny Sharrock: Monkey-Pockie-Boo
Freddie Hubbard: Straight Life
Jan Garbarek: Afric Pepperbird
Evan Parker: The Topography of the Lungs
Spontaneous Music Ensemble: So What Do You Think
Alice Coltrane: Journey in Satchidananda
Pharoah Sanders: Deaf Dumb Blind (Summun Bukmun Umyun)
Stanley Turrentine: Sugar
Sun Ra and his Astro Infinity Arkestra: My Brother the Wind
Woody Shaw: Blackstone Legacy
Freddie Hubbard: Red Clay
McCoy Tyner: Asante
Miles Davis: Bitches' Brew
Leon Thomas: Album
Hubert Laws: Afro-Classic
John McLaughlin: My Goal's Beyond
ICP Orchestra: Groupcomposing
Gunter Hampel: People Symphony
Keith Tippett: Dedicated To You But You Weren't Listening
Misha Mengelberg: Instant Composers Pool 005
Gunter Hampel: Ballet-Symphony
Chris McGregor: And the Brotherhood of Breath
Joe McPhee: Nation Time 
Hugh Masekela: Reconstruction

Deaths

 January
 16 – Lem Davis, American alto saxophonist (born 1914).
 17 – Billy Stewart, American singer, drummer, and pianist (born 1937).

 March
 2 – Emile Barnes, American clarinetist (born 1892).
 21 – Jack Sels, Belgian saxophonist and composer (born 1922).

 April
 10 – Ralph Escudero, Puerto Rican bassist and tubist (born 1898).
 20 – Perry Bradford, African-American composer, songwriter, and vaudeville performer (born 1893).

 May
 10 – Frankie Lee Sims, American singer-songwriter and guitarist (born 1917).
 11 – Johnny Hodges, American alto saxophonist (born 1906).
 24 – Cliff Jackson, American pianist (born 1902).

 June
 16 – Lonnie Johnson, American singer and guitarist (born 1899).

 July
 26 – Fernando Arbello, Puerto Rican trombonist (born 1907).
 31 – Booker Ervin, American saxophonist (born 1930).

 August
 4 – Scoops Carry, American saxophonist and clarinetist (born 1915).
 5 – Otto Hardwick, American saxophonist (born 1904).

 September
 18 – Maxwell Davis, American saxophonist, arranger, and record producer (born 1916).

 October
 11 – Phil Spitalny, American bandleader (born 1890).
 12 – Barney Rapp, American drummer and orchestra leader (born 1900).

 November
 20 – Don Stovall, American alto saxophonist (born 1913).
 25 – Albert Ayler, American saxophonist and singer (born 1936).

 December
 14 – Elmer Schoebel, American pianist and composer (born 1896).

Births

 January
 1 – Karen Souza, Argentin singer.
 4 – Michel Bisceglia, Belgian pianist.
 5 – Jesper Bodilsen, Danish upright bassist.
 19 – Iiro Rantala, Finnish pianist, Trio Töykeät.
 24 – Adam Pierończyk, Polish saxophonist and composer.

 February
 9 – Eldbjørg Raknes, Norwegian singer.
 13 – Adam Cruz, American drummer.
 20
 Craig Taborn, American pianist, organist, keyboardist and composer.
 Éric Legnini, Belgian pianist and bandleader.
 27 – Lina Nyberg, Swedish singer and composer.

 March
 11 – Justin Hayford, American singer and pianist.
 19 – Harald Johnsen, Norwegian upright bassist (died 2011).
 22 – Live Maria Roggen, Norwegian singer and composer, Come Shine.

 April
 1 – Tone Lise Moberg, Norwegian singer.
 15 – Michael Schiefel, German singer.
 20 – Avishai Cohen, Israeli bassist, composer, singer and arranger.
 25 – Kjersti Stubø, Norwegian singer.

 May
 1 – Sacha Perry, American pianist and composer.
 4 
 Giovanni Mirabassi, Italian pianist.
 Jeremy Davenport, American trumpeter and singer.
 6 – Juliet Kelly, British singer and songwriter.
 22 – Jimmy Bennington, American drummer.

 June
 2 – Matt Garrison, American bassist.
 10 – Dwayne Burno, American upright bassist (died 2013).
 12 – Dave Maric, British composer and musician.
 13 – Ron Westray, American trombonist, composer and educator.
 16 – Gregory Hutchinson, American drummer.
 21 – Eric Reed, American pianist and composer.
 22 – Goran Kajfeš, Swedish trumpeter.
 24 – Bernardo Sassetti, Portuguese pianist and film composer (died 2012).

 July
 6
 Médéric Collignon, French vocalist, cornettist and saxhorn player.
 Roger Cicero, German singer (died 2016).
 13 – Glenn Corneille, Dutch pianist (died 2005).
 14 – Jacob Young, Norwegian guitarist.
 15 – Frank McComb, American soul singer and pianist.
 16 – Yinka Davies, Nigerian vocalist, dancer, and lyricist.
 17 – Alvester Garnett, American drummer.
 25 – Brian Blade, American drummer, composer and singer-songwriter.
 30 – Susanne Abbuehl, Swiss-Dutch singer.

 August
 1 – Kishon Khan, Bangladeshi-British pianist, composer, arranger, and music producer.
 21
 Marlon Jordan, American trumpeter, composer, and bandleader.
 Simone Eriksrud, Norwegian singer and composer.
 22 – Erik van der Luijt, Dutch pianist, composer, and band leader.
 23 – Brad Mehldau, American pianist, composer, and band leader.
 24 – Chris Tarry, Canadian bass guitarist.

, September
 3 – Haydain Neale, Canadian singer-songwriter (died 2009).
 24 – Ingrid Laubrock, German soprano, alto, tenor, and baritone saxophonist.
 28 – Neil Yates, British trumpeter.

 October
 5 – Tord Gustavsen (October 5), Norwegian pianist and composer.
 8 – Maria Kannegaard, Danish-born Norwegian pianist.
 16 – Heine Totland, Norwegian singer.
 19 – Jacob Karlzon, Swedish pianist and composer.
 20 – Håvard Lund, Norwegian clarinetist and saxophonist.
 22 – Manuel Mota, Portuguese guitarist.
 23 – Tobias Sjögren, Swedish guitarist and composer.
 24 – Jesse Harris, American singer-songwriter.
 28 – Kurt Rosenwinkel (October 28), American guitarist and keyboardist.
 29 – Toby Smith, British keyboardist and songwriter for Jamiroquai (died 2017).

 November
 15 – Susie Ibarra, American composer and percussionist.
 20 – Geoffrey Keezer, American pianist.
 22 – Chris Fryar, American drummer.

 December
 14 – Anna Maria Jopek, Polish singer.
 18 – Norman Brown, American guitarist.
 24 – Marco Minnemann, German drummer, composer, and multi-instrumentalist.

 Unknown date
 Andreas Paolo Perger, Austrian guitarist, improviser, and composer.
 Anna Mjöll, Icelandic singer and songwriter.
 Dominic Green, British writer and guitarist.
 Kate McGarry, American singer.
 Keith Anderson, American saxophonist.
 Lullaby Baxter, Canadian singer.
 Matt Lavelle, American trumpet, flugelhorn and bass clarinet player.
 Peter Martin, American pianist.
 Tom Brantley, American trombonist.

See also

 1970s in jazz
 List of years in jazz
 1970 in music

References

External links 
 History Of Jazz Timeline: 1970 at All About Jazz

Jazz
Jazz by year